Shaker is the seventeenth studio album by Japanese singer Akina Nakamori and third studio album to be released during the 1990s. It was released on 21 March 1997 under the MCA Records label. The album includes lead singles "Moonlight Shadow: Tsuki ni Hoero" and "Appetite". It was Nakamori's final album released under MCA Records, before her transfer to Gauss Entertainment label.

In 2002 was released re-printed version of the album Shaker+3 which includes the original version of "Moonlight Shadow", "Appetite" and B-side track "Sweet Suspicion", which was previously unreleased in the album recordings.

Promotion

Singles
It consists of two previously released singles.

"Moonlight Shadow: Tsuki ni Hoero" is the thirty-third single written and produced by Tetsuya Komuro. It was released on 7 August 1996, her only single to be released in that year. It includes renewed arrangement with the slower intro start. The original version was included re-printed version of album, Shaker+3 and compilation album Utahime Densetsu: 90's Best under the Universal Music label. The single debuted at number 14 on the Oricon Single Weekly Charts.

"Appetite" is the thirty-fourth single written by Uki. It was released on 21 February 1997, it was her only single to be released in that year. It includes renewed arrangement with the heavy sound of the synthesizer in the beginning, instead of the original bass sound. The original version was included re-printed version of album, Shaker+3 and compilation albums Utahime Densetsu: 90's Best and All Time Best: Original. The single debuted at number 46 on the Oricon Single Weekly Charts and become final single to be released under MCA Records label.

Stage performances
The album tracks "Tsuki ha Aoku", "Mangetsu", "Biyaku", "Yoru no Nioi", "Oishii Mizu" and "Akai Bara ga Yureta" has been performed once in the live tour Felicidad in 1997.

"Appetite" and "Moonlight Shadow" has been performed in the live tour Felicidad and Spoon in 1998, 'Music Fiesta in 2002 and The Last Destination in 2006.

Chart performance
The album reached at number 14 on the Oricon Album Weekly Chart charted for the 5 consecutive weeks with the sales of 43,600 copies.

Track listing

References

1997 albums
Japanese-language albums
Akina Nakamori albums
Albums produced by Akina Nakamori